Fleur or plural Fleurs is French for flower. It may 
 "Fleur" (short story), a short story by Louise Erdrich

Music
 Flëur, a Ukrainian band
 Fleurs (Franco Battiato album), 1999
 Fleurs (Former Ghosts album), 2009
 Les Fleurs (album), by Ramsey Lewis, 1983
Fleurs 2, a 2008 album by Franco Battiato
Fleurs 3, a 2002 album by Franco Battiato
"Les Fleurs", a song by Minnie Riperton from the album Come to My Garden, 1970

See also

 Fleur-de-lis (disambiguation)
 Lafleur (disambiguation)
 Flower (disambiguation)